Elman is both a given name. Notable people with the name include:
 
Given name:
Elman Guttormson (1929–2001), Canadian politician
Elman Mammadov (born 1950), Azerbaijani politician
Elman Rustamov (born 1952), Azerbaijani politician
Elman Service (1915–1996), American cultural anthropologist
Elman Sultanov (born 1974), Azerbaijani footballer
Elman Tagaýew (born 1989), Turkmenistan footballer

See also
 Elman (surname)